The 1982 Camden Council election took place on 6 May 1982 to elect members of Camden London Borough Council in London, England.  The whole council was up for election.

The election, like the election across the country, was marked by the emergence of the SDP–Liberal Alliance.  However, despite winning 25% of the vote across Camden, no Alliance councillors were elected.  Few seats changed hands overall, with the Conservatives gaining two seats from Labour in Bloomsbury in the south and losing one seat to Labour in West Hampstead and one in Highgate.  The Conservatives dominated the north of the seat, winning 19 of the 26 seats in Hampstead parliamentary constituency; Labour dominated the centre, winning 17 of 19 in St Pancras North, and the south, winning 9 of 14 in Holborn and St Pancras South.  , it was the last time that the Conservatives have seriously challenged for outright control of the council.

The day after the election, Labour leader Roy Shaw was replaced by Phil Turner, who became leader of the council.

Election result

Ward results

Adelaide

Belsize

Bloomsbury

Brunswick

Camden

Castlehaven

Caversham

Chalk Farm

Fitzjohns

Fortune Green

Frognal

Gospel Oak

Grafton

Hampstead Town

Highgate

Holborn

Kilburn

King's Cross

Priory

Regent's Park

St John's

St Pancras

Somers Town

South End

Swiss Cottage

West End

References

 

1982
1982 London Borough council elections
May 1982 events in the United Kingdom